Prem Manohar (9 October 1923 – 2013) was an Indian politician. He was a Member of Parliament, representing Uttar  Pradesh in the Rajya Sabha the upper house of India's Parliament as a member of the Janata Party.

References

Rajya Sabha members from Uttar Pradesh
Janata Party politicians
1923 births
2013